Ciuperceni may refer to several places in Romania:

 Ciuperceni, Gorj
 Ciuperceni, Teleorman
 Ciuperceni, a village in Agriș Commune, Satu Mare County
 Ciuperceni, a village in Cosmești, Teleorman